Reality Only Fantasized is the first full-length album by American technical death metal band Capharnaum.

Track listing

Personnel
 Jason Suecof - vocals, guitar, mixing, mastering
 Tony Espinoza - vocals
 Ryan Adams - guitar
 Shawn Greenlaw - bass
 Jordan Suecof - drums

References

1997 debut albums
Capharnaum (band) albums
Albums produced by Jason Suecof